The Flèche Halloise was a Belgian single-day road bicycle race organized for the last time in 1981. The name refers to the finish place Halle in Flemish Brabant.

The competition's roll of honor includes the successes of Rik Van Steenbergen and Roger De Vlaeminck.

Winners

References 

Cycle races in Belgium
1950 establishments in Belgium
Defunct cycling races in Belgium
Recurring sporting events established in 1950
Recurring sporting events disestablished in 1981
1981 disestablishments in Belgium